Schwanthalerhöhe (Central Bavarian: Schwanthalahäh), also called Westend, is a borough of Munich. It is located west of the city center and with a population of about 30,000 on just two square kilometers is one of Munich's most densely populated boroughs.

External links

References

Boroughs of Munich